These are the countries and channels that broadcast the Premier League.

United Kingdom 
From 2022–23 to 2024–25, Premier League matches are being broadcast by Sky, BT & Amazon with highlights on BBC TV.

2022–2025

African broadcasters

Asian broadcasters

European broadcasters (except UK)

Latin American broadcasters

Middle Eastern and North African broadcasters

North American and Caribbean broadcasters

Oceanic broadcasters

Notes

References

External links
 Premier League official website

Overseas
Overseas
Association football on television
English Premier League